Nyon Castle is a castle in the municipality of Nyon of the Canton of Vaud in Switzerland.  It is a Swiss heritage site of national significance.

See also
 List of castles in Switzerland
 Château

References

External links

 Château de Nyon - official site 

Castles in Vaud
Cultural property of national significance in the canton of Vaud
Nyon
Museums in the canton of Vaud
Historic house museums in Switzerland